Nesipelma is a genus of  tarantulas containing the two species, Nesipelma insulare and Nesipelma medium . It was first described by Günter E. W. Schmidt & F. Kovařík in 1996, and is found in Nevis and on the Lesser Antilles.

See also
 List of Theraphosidae species

References

Spiders of the Caribbean
Theraphosidae
Taxa described in 1996